Aframomum albiflorum is a monocotyledonous plant species in the family Zingiberaceae.

References 

albiflorum
Plants described in 1984
Flora of Africa